The Ikoyi Club was established as a European club in 1938 in Ikoyi, Lagos. It was originally converted from a prison to a rest house. It occupies approximately 456 acres of land. In the subsequent years, the European Club merged with the Lagos Golf Club. Besides the golf course, Ikoyi Club also has many sports and relaxation amenities which provide first class facilities for members and their families.

Today, the club has grown from its exclusively European membership to modern day membership of diverse nationalities.
 Some of Nigeria's most aristocratic families are now members.The slogan of the club is Global Harmony Through Recreation.

The present chairman of the club is Mr. Mumuney Ademola.

Sections in the Club 
The club is composed of different sections. These include:

 Golf
 Lawn tennis
 swimming
 Squash
 Table-tennis
 Badminton
 Billiards, Snooker and Pool
 Other Sports

Amenities 
The major amenities of the club included:

 Bars and Kitchens
 Library
 Barber's Shop
 Gymnasuim
 Massage and Sauna

Other information 
The cocktails and club sandwiches are rumoured to be among the best in the world. A famous cocktail amongst Nigerians and other drink lovers is called the Chapman. The recipe for it was created on the grounds of Ikoyi Club by Sam Alamutu, an executive in Ikoyi Hotel (a sister company to the Ikoyi Club) in 1938.

References

External links

Clubs and societies in Lagos
History of Lagos
European-Nigerian culture in Lagos
Ikoyi
Organizations established in 1938
1938 establishments in Nigeria
Multi-sport clubs in Nigeria
Sport in Lagos
Golf clubs and courses in Nigeria